The Recorder of Dublin was a judicial office holder in pre-Independence Ireland.

Functions and duties of the Recorder
The Recorder was the chief magistrate for Dublin, and heard a wide range of civil and criminal cases. The office existed by the next late fifteenth century. From information given during a debate on the duties of the Recorder in the English House of Commons in 1831, it seems that he sat twice a week, with extra sessions as and when the workload required. His chief responsibility was to keep the peace, and he also controlled the number of pubs in the city. The duties were so onerous – by the 1830s the Recorder was hearing roughly 2,000 cases a year – that some Recorders sought promotion to the High Court bench in the belief that the workload there would be lighter. The Recorder also acted on occasion as a mediator in conflicts between the central government and Dublin Corporation.

Although he held a full-time judicial office, the Recorder, unlike the High Court judges, was not debarred from sitting in the Irish House of Commons, and despite their heavy workload, several Recorders served as MPs while sitting on the Bench. After the Act of Union 1800 the Recorder was eligible to sit in the English House of Commons, although an objection was made to this in 1832, on the grounds that a judge should not sit in Parliament and a minority of MPs supported making the Recordership incompatible with a seat in the Commons. Nonetheless, Sir Frederick Shaw, the  Recorder in question, continued in his dual role for many years, until he stepped down as MP in 1848. There was apparently no objection to his combining the office of Recorder with that of a Law Officer: Sir Richard Ryves, Recorder of Dublin 1680-1685, was a King's Serjeant for part of the same period.

The Recorder was not a Crown appointee: he was elected by the Corporation of Dublin, although he could be dismissed by the Crown. There is an interesting account of the election of Dudley Hussey in 1784, when he defeated three rival candidates for office. He was only one of two officials of Dublin Corporation who were elected, the other being the Clerk of the Tholsel.

History of the Office 

Thomas Cusack is named as Recorder of Dublin in 1488. He had clearly held the office in the previous year, when like all the Irish judiciary, he had supported the attempt by the pretender Lambert Simnel to claim the English Crown, and following Simnel's crushing defeat was now required to do penance for his treason and swear fealty to the Tudor dynasty. His disgrace was short-lived: Sir Richard Edgcumbe, who administered the oath of fealty to him, dined with him "with great cheer".

There then appears to be a gap on the records until the sixteenth century, when the office of Recorder was held by Thomas Fitzsimon in 1547, and by his son-in-law James Stanihurst, Speaker of the Irish House of Commons, in 1564. The last  Recorder was Sir Thomas O'Shaughnessy. The Recordership was abolished in 1924 and the Recorder's functions transferred to the new Circuit Court.

List of holders of the office of Recorder of Dublin 1487-1924
Holders of the position have included:
1487/8 Thomas Cusack <ref >Voyage of Sir Richard Edgcumbe into Ireland in 1488</ref >
1547 Thomas Fitzsimon 
1564 James Stanihurst (d. 1573)
 1573 Henry Burnell
 1599 Patrick Fitzgerald
 1601 Sir Edward Loftus  (killed at the Battle of Kinsale)
 c. 1603 Sir William Talbot, 1st Baronet, removed shortly afterwards  as a Roman Catholic
 1604–1613 Richard Bolton
 1620s–1626 James Barry, 1st Baron Barry of Santry
 1626-1634 Nathaniel Catelyn
 1634-1660 John Bysse
 1661–1672 Sir William Davys, later Lord Chief Justice of Ireland.
 1672 Elisha Leighton
 1680-1685 Sir Richard Ryves
 1685-1687 Colonel Garrett Dillon
 1687 Sir John Barnewall
 1690–1693 Thomas CooteBall vol. II p. 61.
 1693-1695 Nehemiah Donnellan
 1695–1701 Sir William Handcock
 1701–1714 John Forster
 1733–1750 Eaton Stannard
 1751-1756 Thomas Morgan
 1756–1766 James Grattan (father of Henry Grattan)
 1766–1784 Samuel Bradstreet
 1784–1785 Dudley Hussey
 1785–1794 Denis George, later Baron of the Court of Exchequer (Ireland)
 1794–1820 William Walker  Elected 30 May 1794 Died 31 December 1820
 1822–1828 Sir Jonas Greene
 1828–1876 Sir Frederick Shaw
 1876–1905 Sir Frederick Falkiner (1831–1908)
1905–1924 Sir Thomas O'Shaughnessy (1850–1933), the last Recorder of Dublin

 References 
 F. Elrington Ball (1926) The Judges in Ireland, 1221-1921 Dictionary of National Biography (DNB)
 Hansard's Parliamentary Debates 1831
 Jacqueline R. Hill (1997) From Patriots to Unionists: Dublin Civic Politics and Irish Protestant Patriotism, 1660-1840The Voyage of Sir Richard Edgcumbe into Ireland in 1488''

Sources

Notes 

1564 establishments in Ireland
1924 disestablishments in Ireland
History of County Dublin
Lists of Irish people